DH class could refer to several types of locomotives:
 BHP Whyalla DH class
 NIR 1 Class
 New Zealand DH class locomotive
 Queensland Railways DH class